The Polish Women's Volleyball League, known for sponsorship reasons as TAURON Liga (previously known as Orlen Liga and PlusLiga Kobiet) is the highest level of women's volleyball played in Poland.

Current teams
As of 2022–23 season

Medallists

Total titles won

All-time team records

Since 1929:

City

Since 2015/16:

(Based on W=2 pts and D=1 pts)

See also 
 PlusLiga
 Volleyball in Poland
 Sports in Poland

External links 
  (in Polish)
  TAURON Liga. women.volleybox.net 

Volleyball competitions in Poland
Women's volleyball in Poland
Poland
Women's sports leagues in Poland
Poland
Professional sports leagues in Poland